Skemp is a surname. Notable people with the surname include:
Bob Skemp, Canadian football player
Stephen Skemp (1912–2004), British clergyman
Susan Skemp, American mechanical engineer
Terence Skemp (1915–1996), British lawyer
Tom Skemp (1897–1977), American multi-sport athlete and coach

See also
Franciscan Skemp Medical Center